Michael E. Smith (born 1977) is an American artist whose minimal sculptures often juxtapose appropriated, discarded everyday items found in urban decay and on eBay. His works have been shown in MoMA PS1, SculptureCenter, the Eli and Edythe Broad Art Museum and the 2019 Venice Biennale.

Selected exhibitions 

Solo
 2018: Atlantis, Marseille
 2018: David Ireland House, San Francisco
 2017:Stedelijk Museum voor Actuele Kunst, Ghent
2016: pig, Capri, Düsseldorf

Group
 2022 Whitney Biennial
 2019: Venice Biennale
 2017: "All Watched Over by Machines of Loving Grace", Palais de Tokyo

References

External links

Further reading 

 
 
 
 
 
 
 
 
 

1977 births
Artists from Detroit
Artists from Providence, Rhode Island
Yale School of Art alumni
College for Creative Studies alumni
Sculptors from Michigan
Living people